Mukim Bokok is a mukim in Temburong District, Brunei.

Name 
The mukim is named after Kampong Bokok, one of the villages it encompasses.

Geography 
The mukim is located in the west of the Temburong District to the south, bordering Mukim Bangar to the north-east, Mukim Amo to the east, and the Malaysian state of Sarawak to the south and west.

Demographics 
As of 2016 census, the population was 3,433 with  males and  females. The mukim had 633 households occupying 602 dwellings. The entire population lived in rural areas.

Villages 
As of 2016, the mukim comprised the following census villages:

Notes

References 

Bokok
Temburong District